Domingo may refer to:

People
Domingo (name), a Spanish name and list of people with that name
Domingo (producer) (born 1970), American hip-hop producer
Saint Dominic (1170–1221), Castilian Catholic priest, founder of the Friars popularly called the Dominicans

Music

Albums
Domingo (Benny Golson album), 1992 album by jazz saxophonist/composer Benny Golson
Domingo (Gal Costa and Caetano Veloso album), an album by Brazilian artists Caetano Veloso and Gal Costa
Domingo (Titãs album), a 1995 album by Brazilian band Titãs

Songs
"Domingo" (song), the title song from Titãs' album
"Domingo", a song by Yello on their album Stella

Other uses
Subaru Domingo, the Japanese market name for the Subaru Sumo 
Sunday, the first day of the week called Domingo, in Spanish and Portuguese

See also

San Domingo (disambiguation)
Santo Domingo (disambiguation)
Dominic
Domingos (name)